Blake Mueller (born 10 March 1982) is an Australian former professional rugby league footballer. He played as a half back.  His brother Brock played for the Newcastle Knights between 1998 and 1999.

Background
Mueller was born in Belmont, New South Wales.

Playing career
Mueller made his first grade debut for Newcastle against Melbourne in Round 8 2003 against Melbourne which ended in a 46–6 loss.  

In 2005, Mueller was one of 11 players fined by the club for misconduct after a pre-season game in Bathurst.

It was alleged that some of the Newcastle players had broken curfew to visit dormitories at Charles Sturt University.  It was reported that one of the players had jumped on a student as she slept in her bed and touched her inappropriately.  One of the Newcastle players Dane Tilse was deregistered by the NRL for 12 months.

Mueller made 10 appearances for Newcastle in 2005 as the club endured a horror season finishing last and claiming the wooden spoon.  His final game for the club was a 28–14 loss against the Sydney Roosters in Round 17 2005.

References

1982 births
Living people
Australian rugby league players
Lakes United Seagulls players
Newcastle Knights players
Rugby league halfbacks
Rugby league players from Newcastle, New South Wales